Chinadorai Deshmutu (born October 26, 1932, date of death unknown) was an Indian hockey player who competed in the 1952 Summer Olympics. He was a member of the Indian field hockey team, which won the gold medal. He played one match as goalkeeper.

External links
 

1932 births
Year of death missing
Olympic field hockey players of India
Field hockey players at the 1952 Summer Olympics
Indian male field hockey players
Olympic gold medalists for India
Olympic medalists in field hockey
Asian Games medalists in field hockey
Field hockey players at the 1958 Asian Games
Medalists at the 1952 Summer Olympics
Asian Games silver medalists for India
Medalists at the 1958 Asian Games